The 2001–02 Scottish Challenge Cup was the 11th season of the competition, which was also known as the Bell's Challenge Cup for sponsorship reasons. It was competed for by the 30 member clubs of the Scottish Football League. The defending champions were Airdrieonians, who defeated Livingston 3–2 on penalties in the 2000 final.

The final was played on 14 October 2001, between Airdrieonians and Alloa Athletic at Broadwood Stadium in Cumbernauld. Airdrieonians won 2–1, to win the tournament for a third time after winning the 1994 and 2000 finals.

Schedule

First round 
Clydebank and Dumbarton received random byes into the second round.

Source: ESPN Soccernet and Soccerbase

Second round 

Source: ESPN Soccernet and Soccerbase

Quarter-finals

Semi-finals

Final

References

External links 
 Scottish Football League Scottish Challenge Cup on Scottish Football League website
 Soccerbase Scottish League Challenge Cup on Soccerbase.com
 ESPN Soccernet  Scottish League Challenge Cup homepage on ESPN Soccernet
 statto.com  Scottish Challenge Cup fixtures and results on statto.com
 BBC Sport – Scottish Cups Challenge Cup on BBC Sport

Scottish Challenge Cup seasons
Challenge Cup
Scottish Challenge Cup